Kaitlyn Michelle Siragusa (born December 2, 1993), better known as Amouranth (pronounced as "amaranth"), is an American Internet celebrity, streamer, and OnlyFans model. Siragusa is also known for her ASMR Twitch livestreams.

Career 
Siragusa initially was a cosplayer, appearing at character parties for children and hospital visits. In 2016, she was asked by streaming company Twitch to join as a content creator and livestream making costumes. She accepted and by 2021, became the most popular female streamer on Twitch, known for her dancing, ASMR and hot tub streaming content. In 2021, Amouranth with 1.79 million has taken the top spot from Pokimane with only 1.77 million and Fuslie trailing on third with 1.74 million. On October 8, 2021, Siragusa was banned from Twitch for the fifth time, as well as Instagram and TikTok. 

By July 2022, Siragusa was reported to have earned $33 million through OnlyFans. Amouranth shared in February 2023, that she earns around $100,000 a month on Twitch including income from subscribers. In addition she earns $1.5 million a month for content posted on her OnlyFans account. Siragusa also does cosplays, NSFW content and often pairs in streams with other Twitch streamers. 

In November 2021, Siragusa announced on her Twitter that she had bought a gas station, which she is renting out to a Circle K. In January 2022, she announced that she had also bought an inflatable pool toy company. In April 2022, she announced that she was quitting her OnlyFans and associated online activities to focus on Twitch by the end of June of that year. In July 2022, she announced she was starting a company matching personal assistants with content creators.

Personal life 
On October 15, 2022, Siragusa revealed on-stream that she had been married for several years, after her stream was interrupted by her husband, who could be heard verbally abusing her live on stream. Siragusa revealed that her husband controls her finances, coerced her to stream more than she was willing to, and threatened to kill her dogs if she did not obey his demands. A few days following the incident, Siragusa stated she was seeking legal and emotional counsel, regained access to her finances and that her husband was out of her life and is seeking help.

Awards and nominations

References 

Twitch (service) streamers
Women video bloggers
OnlyFans creators
Living people
YouTubers from Texas
Entertainers from Houston
Cosplayers
Streamer Award winners
1993 births